Cornforth is a surname. Notable people with the surname include:

Arthur Cornforth (1861–1938), American politician
Fanny Cornforth (1835–1909), English artist's model and mistress of Dante Gabriel Rossetti
John Cornforth (disambiguation), multiple people
Mark Cornforth (born 1972), Canadian ice hockey player
Maurice Cornforth (1909–1980), British Marxist philosopher